The 2018 Stock Car Brasil Championship was the fortieth season of the Stock Car Brasil.

Teams and drivers
All teams compete with a Chevrolet Cruze Stock Car.

Team changes
The Squadra G-Force team premiered in 2018 at Stock Car after purchasing the cars of C2 team, that did not compete in 2017.
Full Time Sports reduced their program from six to four cars. After the team decided to withdraw the two cars of satellite team Full Time Academy. FTS and Bassani Racing still the partnership with two cars, but now without the name and sponsor of HERO, that moved to RCM Motorsport, with a new sponsor the team pass to be called Texaco Racing. Cavaleiro Sports bought one car of FTS and expanded to three cars this season.
 For this season, TMG Shell changed their name to Shell V-Power due to sponsor reasons.

Driver changes
Denis Navarro moved to Cavaleiro Racing leaving Cimed Racing Team. Galid Osman will be his partner after left Ipiranga Racing. 
Ricardo Mauricio left Eurofarma RC after nine seasons and joined Full Time Sports. Max Wilson, was relocated to Eurofarma RC, after one season in satellite team RCM.
Allam Khodair moved to Blau Motorsport after four season in FTS.
Bia Figueiredo and Lucas Foresti left Full Time Academy after FTS decided to reduce your program. Figueiredo moved to Ipiranga Racing and Foresti moved to Cimed Racing Team.
Cimed Racing decided to change the places of Felipe Fraga and Marcos Gomes, now, Gomes will race in the customer team.
Tuka Rocha left RCM after a single season to join Vogel Motorsport.
Sérgio Jimenez and Gustavo Lima left Bardahl Hot Car to join the newcomer team Squadra G-Force. In his places Rafael Suzuki and Guilherme Salas joined the team. Suzuki left Cavaleiro Sports, while Salas moved from Vogel Motorsport.
Formula E champions, Lucas di Grassi and Nelson Piquet Jr. joined the series in a full season. Di Grassi joined HERO Motosport and Piquet joined Full Time Bassani. Ex GP3 Series driver Bruno Baptista also entered in the series with HERO.
Vítor Meira and Tarso Marques returned to the series with Mico's Racing.
Marcio Campos and Alberto Valerio will not return this season.

Mid-season changes
After the first round, Mico's Racing changed their two drivers. Fernando Croce and Fabio Carbone entered in the places of Vítor Meira and Tarso Marques. Croce and Carbone raced in first round as wildcard drivers. After that the team not returned to the rest of the season.
The Santa Cruz round was affected by the German Formula E round.
 Lucas Di Grassi was replaced by Nono Figueiredo. World Touring Car Cup driver Esteban Guerrieri raced as wildcard for Hero in the eighth round and as a substitute driver of Di Grassi in the tenth race, due the Formula E tests in Valencia. Hero Motorsport also added an extra car at Corrida do Milhão with Portuguese driver António Félix da Costa and in the last round with Gaetano Di Mauro.
 Nelson Piquet Jr's entry was withdrawn from that round.  Due to the Formula E tests at Valencia, Piquet lost the practice and qualifying seasons.
 At 10ª Corrida do Milhão Pirelli, Cimed Racing had two extra drivers Felipe Massa and Agustin Canapino. Massa drove for the team in the first round. In a partner of Bardhal Hot Car and RZ Motorsport Renato Braga also raced. 
After five rounds the new team Squadra G-Force abandoned the series. Guga Lima changed to Vogel Motorsport in the place of Tuka Rocha, but Jimenez not raced until the end of the season.
Guilherme Salas lost his place in Bardahl Hot Car, the team called the Argentine driver Nestor Girolami, who returned for the series, after two rounds was called Ricardo Sperafico.
 Due to the last round of International GT Open, Allam Khodair did not race at the tenth round. In his place Blau Motorsport called Kelvin van der Linde, who finished in third place at the first round as wildcard for the team.
With the interest to race in 2019 season, Stock Car Light team KTF Sports entered in the series at the last round with William Starostik, who returned for the series after seven seasons.

Race calendar and results
The Stock Car Brasil 2018 season schedule, announced on January 18, begins on March 10, on a Saturday, with the return of the Interlagos endurance round with two drivers. There was a three-month break between the May 20 round in Santa Cruz do Sul-RS and the August 5 "Million Real" round at Goiânia because of the 2018 FIFA World Cup. The 2018 championship was also concluded at Interlagos on December 9. The Stock Light (former Brazilian Tournament Championship, which returned after 10 years) and the Campeonato Brasileiro de Marcas were be the series' support divisions.

Championship standings
Points system
Points are awarded for each race at an event to the driver/s of a car that completed at least 75% of the race distance and was running at the completion of the race.

Feature races: Used for the first race of each event.
First race/Sprint races: Used the first round with wildcards drivers and for the second race of each event, with partially reversed (top ten) grid .
Million Race: Used for One Million dollars race.
Final race: Used for the last round of the season with double points.

Drivers' Championship

References

Notes

External links
  

Stock Car Brasil seasons
Stock Car Brasil